Jiang Kun may refer to:

Jiang Kun (comedian) (born 1950), Chinese comedian
Jiang Kun (footballer) (born 1978), Chinese footballer